Danilovka is an urban locality (a work settlement) and the administrative center of Danilovsky District of Volgograd Oblast, Russia. Population:

References

Urban-type settlements in Volgograd Oblast